Oppeln-Bronikowski is a surname. Notable people with the surname include:

Friedrich von Oppeln-Bronikowski (1873–1936), German writer, translator, biographer, publisher and cultural historian
Hermann von Oppeln-Bronikowski (1899–1966), German general

Compound surnames
German-language surnames